The 2019–20 Boise State Broncos men's basketball team represented Boise State University during the 2019–20 NCAA Division I men's basketball season. The Broncos, led by tenth-year head coach Leon Rice, played their home games at ExtraMile Arena as a member of the Mountain West Conference. They finished the season 20–12, 11–7 in Mountain West play to finish in a tie for fifth place. They defeated UNLV in the quarterfinals of the Mountain West tournament before losing in the semifinals to San Diego State.

Previous season
The Broncos 13–20, 7–11 in Mountain West play to finish in a three-way tie for seventh place. They defeated Colorado State in the first round of the Mountain West tournament to advance to the quarterfinals where they lost to Nevada. This was the first time in Boise State history that they lost 20 games in a season.

Offseason

Departures

Incoming transfers

2019 recruiting class

2020 recruiting class

Roster

Schedule and results

|-
!colspan=9 style=| Exhibition

|- 
!colspan=9 style=| Regular season

|-
!colspan=9 style=| Mountain West tournament

References

Boise State Broncos men's basketball seasons
Boise State
Boise
Boise